Muyu, Moyu, or Kati is one of the Ok languages of Western New Guinea.

The related Ninggerum language is also called 'Muyu'.

References

Languages of western New Guinea
Ok languages